Ziresovir (RO-0529, AK0529) is an antiviral drug which was developed as a treatment for respiratory syncytial virus. It acts as a fusion inhibitor, and has shown good results in Phase II and III clinical trials.

See also 
 Palivizumab
 Presatovir
 Lumicitabine

References 

Anti–RNA virus drugs
Antiviral drugs
Sulfones
Oxetanes
Benzothiazepines
Quinazolines
Amines